Chloé Aïcha Boro Letterier (born 24 May 1978) is a Burkinabé film director and screenwriter.

Biography
Boro grew up in Ouagadougou near the Balolé quarry. She studied modern literature and pursued a career as a journalist. She wrote for the Burkinabé magazines and newspapers "La Voix du Sahel" and "Le Marabout", and published her first novel, Paroles orpheline, in 2006. Partially autobiographical, it received the Naji Naaman Prize in Lebanon. Boro gradually turned her attention to film, and served as assistant director and presenter of the TV program Koodo, receiving the Galian Prize in 2006. She also produced a documentary about genetically-modified organisms and presented a radio program for Radio Gambidi. In 2010, Boro moved to France.

In 2012, she directed her first film, Sur les traces de Salimata. Boro came out with her first feature-length documentary, Farafin Ko, in 2014. In 2017, she directed France-Aurevoir, le nouveau commerce triangulaire. It was named Best Documentary at the Festival international de cinéma Vues d’Afrique in Montreal. The film examines the triangular cotton trade. In 2018, Boro wrote the novel Notre Djihad intérieur, examining the topics of exile and contradictions of faith by telling the story of an African expatriate living in France returning to his village. Boro directed Le Loup d'or de Balolé in 2019. The documentary examines the workers at the Balolé quarry and the effects of the political revolution in 2014. It received the Best Feature Documentary at the Panafrican Film and Television Festival of Ouagadougou.

Filmography
2012: Sur les traces de Salimata
2014: Farafin Ko
2017: France-Aurevoir, le nouveau commerce triangulaire
2019: Le Loup d'or de Balolé

Awards 

 2019, Golden Stallion Prize for “The Golden Wolf of Balolé”

References

External links
Aïcha Chloé Boro at the Internet Movie Database.

1978 births
Living people
Burkinabé women film directors
Burkinabé women writers
Burkinabé expatriates in France
People from Ouagadougou
21st-century Burkinabé people